

Africa (CAF)

 
Took place in Tripoli, Libya from 21 March to 30 March 2008.

 Final Standing & qualified nations
 
 
 
 
 
 
 
 
 
 

Bold: Qualified to World Cup

Europe (UEFA)

Took place in many countries and cities from 23 February to 16 April 2008.

Participants & qualified nations 
 
 
 
 
 
 
 
 
 
 
 
 
 
 
 
 
 
 
 
 
 
 
 
 
 
 
 
 
 
 
 
 
 
 
 
 
 
 

Bold: Qualified to World Cup
Italic: Lost in Play-offs

Asia (AFC)

Iran, Thailand, Japan & China qualified

North America, Central America and Caribbean (CONCACAF)

Took place in Guatemala City, Guatemala from 2 June to 8 June 2008.

 Final Standing & qualified nations

 

 

Bold: Qualified to World Cup

Oceania (OFC)

Took place in Suva, Fiji from 8 June to 14 June 2008.

Final Standing & qualified nations:

Bold: Qualified to World Cup

South America (CONMEBOL)

Took place in Montevideo, Uruguay from 23 June to 28 June 2008.

Final Standing & qualified nations:
 
 
 
 *
  
  
 
 
 
 

Bold: Qualified to World Cup
* Qualified to World Cup since Brazil qualified as the host of the championship

 

Qualification, 2008 Fifa Futsal World Cup
2008